Sir John Champneys (1495–1556) was City of London Sheriff in 1522 and Lord Mayor of London in 1534, when he was knighted.

Life
A merchant, Champneys began the building of Hall Place, Bexley, in about 1537. The son of Robert Champneys of Chew Magna, Somerset, he was a member of the Worshipful Company of Skinners. A contemporary chronicler, John Stow, noted that he was blind in later life: a divine judgment for having added "a high tower of brick" to his house in Mincing Lane, "the first that I ever heard of in any private man's house, to overlook his neighbours in this city."

He married twice. His first wife was Margaret (died by 1515), daughter of Thomas Murfyn, and widow of Roger Hall.
His second wife was Merial Barret (died 1534) by whom he had three sons:
 Francis
 Clement
 Justinian

He died on 3 October 1556 and was buried on 8 October at St Mary the Virgin, Bexley.

See also
 List of Sheriffs of the City of London
 List of Lord Mayors of London

Notes

References
 
 
 
 

 
 

16th-century lord mayors of London
Sheriffs of the City of London
1495 births
1556 deaths
Knights Bachelor